Lev is the surname of:

People
 Elena Lev (born 1981), Cirque du Soleil performer
 Gabriella Lev,  theatre director, writer and performer
 Jakub Lev (born 1990), Czech ice hockey player
 Jaroslav Lev of Rožmitál (c. 1425–1486), Bohemian nobleman
 Jiri Lev, Australian architect
 Nadya Lev, Russian-American photographer, editor, publisher, designer and entrepreneur
 Ray Lev (1912–1968), American classical pianist
 Sam Lev, Israeli bridge player
 Shimon Lev (born 1962), Israeli multidisciplinary artist, writer, photographer, curator and researcher
 Zdeněk Lev of Rožmitál (c. 1470–1535), Bohemian nobleman
 Ze'ev Lev (1922–2004), born William Low, Israeli physicist, Torah scholar and founder of the Jerusalem College of Technology

Fictional characters
 Asher Lev, protagonist of two Chaim Potok novels: My Name Is Asher Lev and The Gift of Asher Lev